Lvovsky (masculine), Lvovskaya (feminine), or Lvovskoye (neuter) may refer to:

Lvovsky, Moscow Oblast, an urban-type settlement in Moscow Oblast, Russia
Lvovskoye, Tver Oblast, a village in Tver Oblast, Russia
an island in Lake Nero, Yaroslavl Oblast, Russia

People with the surname
Celia Lovsky (Caecilie Lvovsky; 1897–1979), Austrian-American actress
Noémie Lvovsky (born 1964), French film director, screenwriter, and actress
Alexandr L. Lvovsky, discoverer of many plant species including Martyringa hoenei

See also
Lev (disambiguation), name from which "Lvovsky" is derived
Lvov (disambiguation)
Lvovo (disambiguation)